Zamia fairchildiana is a species of plant in the family Zamiaceae. It is found in southeastern Costa Rica and Panama. In Costa Rica, it is found around the Sierpe River and Claro River, and on Burica Peninsula, Puntarenas Province. Its natural habitats are subtropical or tropical moist lowland forests and subtropical or tropical moist montane forests. It is threatened by habitat loss.

References

fairchildiana
Near threatened plants
Taxonomy articles created by Polbot